Sachal Goth is one of the neighborhoods of Gulshan Town in Karachi, Sindh, Pakistan.

There are several ethnic groups in Sachal Goth including  Sindhis as majority, Muhajirs, Punjabis, Kashmiris, Seraikis, Pakhtuns, Balochs, etc. Over 99% of the population is Muslim. The population of Gulshan Town is estimated to be nearly one million.

References

External links 
 Karachi Website.
 http://wikimapia.org/#lat=24.910824&lon=67.1420002&z=16&l=0&m=b

Neighbourhoods of Karachi
Gulshan Town